Mamaengaroa Kerr-Bell (born 1978) is a New Zealand Māori actress.

Biography
Her breakthrough role as Grace Heke in the Lee Tamahori film, Once Were Warriors, based on the book of the same name by Alan Duff, was as a "sixteen-year-old newcomer [when Kerr-Bell] was discovered by casting director Don Selwyn while accompanying a friend to the auditions for Once Were Warriors. She had never acted before but when Selwyn asked her if she'd like to read, she accepted and instantly won over Rena Owen and Temuera Morrison, who play her character's parents. About her role she says, "Some things I had to pretend but other things I could relate to quite well. I know a lot of people whose father would beat them and their mother and I could relate to Grace helping her mother bring up the kids because I have a little brother and two baby sisters."

Director Tamahori says she "was just a natural. I was astounded by what she had behind her eyes and the sheer timeless beauty of her face. She looked both old and young and I had seen faces like that in a lot of research I'd done. She seemed to carry a lot of history with her and it was a haunting face".

In 2014 she recalled her 1994 role for a documentary made on the film's 20th anniversary. She now lives in Cairns, Australia and works in real estate; she has no immediate plans to return to acting.

Filmography
"Mataku" - The Sisters (2002) TV Episode .... Nola
Staunch (2000) (TV)
"Duggan" - Last Resort (1999) TV Episode .... Private Kate Ngarimu
Shortland Street (1992) TV Series .... Tania Rikihana (1997)
''Once Were Warriors (1994) .... Grace Heke

References

About the Once Were Warriors Cast - Fine Line Features.

1978 births
Living people
New Zealand film actresses
New Zealand television actresses
People from Whangārei
New Zealand Māori actresses
Ngāpuhi people
Ngāti Hine people
New Zealand soap opera actresses
20th-century New Zealand actresses
21st-century New Zealand actresses
New Zealand expatriates in Australia